Reyes de Jalisco (English: Jalisco Kings) are an American football team based in Zapopan, Jalisco, Mexico. The Reyes compete in the Liga de Fútbol Americano Profesional (LFA), the top American football league in Mexico. The team plays its home games at the Estadio Tres de Marzo.

History
The team was established on 20 December 2021 as one of the two expansion teams for the 2022 LFA season, the other team being the Galgos de Tijuana. On that same date, Enrique Alfaro, who led the Mayas to the 2016 and 2017 championships, was appointed as head coach.

The team colors are blue and gold. These colors can be found in the flag and coat of arms of the state of Jalisco.

Placekicker Gabriel Amavizca, who previously played for the CFL team Hamilton Tiger-Cats, was the first player signed by the Reyes.

In their first season, the Reyes reached the playoffs as the fifth seed, but lost the wild card game to the Raptors 6–26.

Roster

Staff

Season-by-season

Notable players
 Gabriel Amavizca – K (2022)

References

Liga de Fútbol Americano Profesional teams
American football teams established in 2021
Sports teams in Jalisco
2021 establishments in Mexico